Tommy Albert Blom (3 March 1947 – 25 May 2014) was a Swedish singer, songwriter and musician. He was a member of the band Tages in the 1960s.

Tages
Blom formed Tages in 1963, originally as a duo with Anders Topel. They performed with acoustic guitars during a regatta in Hovås, south of Gothenburg. Because of popular reception, the duo quickly recruited guitarist Danne Larsson, bassist Göran Lagerberg, and later drummer Freddie Skantze. 

Tages were one of the most successful Swedish bands of the 1960s. They achieved thirteen top-20 singles on Kvällstoppen, such as "Sleep Little Girl", "I Should Be Glad", "In My Dreams", and "Miss Mac Baren", as well as having two albums certified gold, Tages (1965) and Tages 2 (1966).

Tommy left Tages in 1968, and so, the group changed their name to Blond, before splitting a year later.

Later Works
In the mid 1990s, he started hosting Vinyl 107. In 2008, he lost that job because "he was too old", but he returned in 2011. Every Sunday, 60-tals morgon, his programme with songs from the 1960s, was broadcast on Vinyl 107. Before he worked at Vinyl 107, he worked as a music teacher at the school Kvarnbäcksskolan in Haninge.

Blom was a member of the music groups Idolerna and The Cadillac band. He's also known for voicing Mr. Krabs in the Swedish dub of SpongeBob SquarePants until his death.

Death
Blom died on 25 May 2014 in Sweden aged 67.

Discography

Tages

Albums
 Tages (1965)
 Tages 2 (1966)
 Extra Extra (1966)
 Contrast (1967)
 Studio (1967)

Idolerna

Albums 

 2000: Idolerna
 2001: Greatest Hits, Live & More

Singles 

 2001: "Här kommer kärleken"
 2001: "Nu leker livet"
 2001: "Sommar"

References

See Also 
 
 

1947 births
2014 deaths
Swedish radio personalities
Singers from Gothenburg
Swedish male singers